Szymon Drenger, also Szymon Draenger, (Krakow 1917 — Krakow 1943), married to Gusta Davidson Draenger, was a leader of a Jewish partisan organization known as the Fighting Pioneer, in Hebrew Hechalutz Ha'Lochem, during World War II. He and three other members of the Fighting Pioneer attacked and killed 20 German soldiers in a cafe. Szymon Drenger and his wife, she was also part of the underground organization, were both killed by Gestapo in November 1943.

References 

1917 births
1943 deaths
Jewish partisans
Polish Jews who died in the Holocaust